The Top (Roscoe Dillon) is a supervillain appearing in comic books published by DC Comics.

The character has made limited appearances across DC-related media while a female version appeared in the live-action television series The Flash, portrayed by Ashley Rickards.

Publication history
Top first appeared in The Flash #122 (August 1961) and was created by John Broome and Carmine Infantino.

Fictional character biography
Roscoe Dillon is a small-time crook who turns his childhood obsession with tops into a criminal persona. Roscoe taught himself how to spin around fast enough to deflect bullets and produce other semi-useful effects. Top soon discovers that the spinning increased his intelligence as well (because his body and thus his mind are spinning at super human speeds), allowing him to create a variety of trick tops. He tried to blackmail the world with an atomic top that would destroy half the world when it slowed down and imprisoned the Flash inside it, but the Flash vibrated out of it and sent it into space. His unique gimmick and moderate success in crime soon makes him a respected member of the Flash's Rogues Gallery. He dates Golden Glider, Captain Cold's sister, while coaching her on ice skating. Eventually, Top develops immense psionic powers, as years of spinning moves dormant brain cells to the outer areas of his brain, endowing him with mental powers.

However, the newly activated brain cells are destroyed by close proximity to the Flash's superspeed vibrations. Top dies within days from the injuries sustained by his brain, but not before he plants a series of powerful bombs to destroy Central City as a final revenge. In addition, he prepared a recording explaining his terminal condition and scheme to spitefully challenge his comrades to attempt to find and defuse the explosives which must be done by gathering them all and stacking them on top of each other, knowing that the Flash would surely stop at least one of the attempts and doom the city. Knowing that neither the superhero nor the police would believe them if they tried to warn either of the crisis, the Rogues desperately attempt to find the bombs despite the Flash's unwitting opposition. Fortunately, the Flash eventually realizes the situation and aids in stopping the scheme in time.

When Barry Allen's parents were in a car accident, Dillon's spirit is somehow able to take possession of the vacant body of his father, Henry. Realizing who Barry Allen is, he, along with Golden Glider, plot to kill the Flash and take over his body. He fails when he tries to take over the Flash's body while Flash is alive, leaving Henry's spirit to repossess his body.

Brainwashing
About a week after, Roscoe Dillon takes possession of another comatose body and begins wreaking havoc on anyone Barry Allen knew. The final straw comes when he digs up the grave of Iris Allen (who was dead at the time). After knocking him out, Barry takes Dillon to the Justice League Watchtower and asks Zatanna to alter his mind to make him a hero. It works at first, but Dillon is soon driven insane with guilt for all the trouble he has caused. His villainous nature comes into conflict with the spell Zatanna put on him, driving him mad. During that time, he uses his mental powers to "fix" the other rogues by implementing mental programs to make them reform. Some of them are able to reject the programming altogether, such as Captain Cold, Weather Wizard, and Captain Boomerang, while others, including Pied Piper, Heat Wave, and the original Trickster, either seem to remain under the programming or truly reform, at least until Dillon reveals his reprogramming.

Dillon apparently returns to his villainous ways after inhabiting a new body, one of Senator Thomas O'Neill, a vice-presidential nominee. He plans to become president by setting Piper up to assassinate his running mate after they win, but is stopped by the new Flash, Wally West. Dillon is imprisoned after this, causing him to become more disoriented and insane than before. His "mind-over-matter" powers evolve to where Top can induce vertigo in others.

During the events of Identity Crisis, Wally receives a note from Barry about what he did to Top's mind and asks Wally to restore Top's mind back to its original state. With Zatanna, he manages to find Top behind an old toy factory and repair his mind. Now sane, Top tells them about his "fixing" of the Rogues and swears to remove their mental programming and return them back to their villainous ways.

While Captain Cold and his Rogues are warring against Trickster and the reformed Rogues, Top appears with his set of Rogues consisting of Plunder, Murmur, Tar Pit, Girder, and Double Down, having altered their brains. He removes his programming from Piper and Trickster (although Wally is apparently able to return Piper to his better nature by reminding his friend of his secret identity). After removing Heat Wave's programming, he declares himself the new leader of the Rogues and has his group of reprogrammed Rogues attack Flash. Captain Cold flash-freezes Top and shatters his body in retaliation for manipulating the Rogues' minds and setting them against one another, grimly informing Top that his superior cultural and culinary knowledge did not make him better than the rest of the Rogues.

Blackest Night
In Blackest Night #1, Top's grave is approached by a black ring. Later, he joins his fellow Black Lantern Rogues in an attack on Iron Heights prison.

The New 52
In The New 52 (a 2011 reboot of the DC Comics universe), a version of Top exists under the name of Turbine. Roscoe Hynes was a Tuskegee Airman who led a squadron of prototype planes on its first combat mission during World War II. During the battle Hynes breaks formation to test the prototype plane's flight capabilities, and disappears into thin air. It is later revealed that Hynes was absorbed into the Speed Force dimension and trapped there for about seventy years. Driven insane due to isolation, he tried desperately to escape using his newfound ability to control the wind, but this only served to create massive wormholes that pulled people and objects (including an entire ship) into the Speed Force. The Flash, trying to save the ship's passengers, enters the Force. Turbine confronts him, and their battle ends with both being sent back to Earth An amnesic Hynes later reappears in Central City; he recovers his memories upon hearing The Flash being mentioned and promises to tell Patty Spivot (who believes Barry Allen is dead) where Barry is.

A separate character named Roscoe Dillon appears later in The New 52 as one of the "Acolytes of Zoom". This character does not use the codename of his Pre-New 52 counterpart. This version also has the ability to control centrifugal force, having created a tornado in his hometown prior to being found by Zoom.

In the Watchmen sequel Doomsday Clock, Top and his fellow Rogues are among the villains that attend the underground meeting held by Riddler that talks about the Superman Theory.

Powers and abilities
Top is able to spin at incredible speeds. The spinning also gave him increased intelligence, as his brain was also moving at incredible speeds. The Top's spinning eventually gives him powerful telekinetic and telepathic powers due to the stimulation of his brain cells. Since his soul returned from Hell, he has developed a new mental ability that allows him to induce severe disorientation and vertigo in his victims. Top also uses spinning tops with gimmicks to them such as glue, explosives, oil and gases. He once built a massive "atomic grenade top" that could have destroyed half of the world.

Other versions

25th Century Top
A heroic version of Top is part of the 25th Century cops known as The Renegades, from Professor Zoom's future. When the Renegades attempt to arrest Barry for a crime he will commit in the future, Top abandons his team to help Barry, attempting to prevent the events that lead to Barry's accusation. Once he convinces Barry to let him help, it appears as though he is actually framing Barry for a crime he committed. It is subsequently revealed that Top is actually attempting to prevent Barry from investigating previous 'cold cases' to leave an innocent man in jail, as the man who actually committed the crime is an ancestor of the future Top; the future Top spent his whole life training to join the Renegades, but the organisation will not allow members in if anyone in their families (no matter how far back) has a criminal record, prompting Top to set up events to ensure that his ancestor stays out of prison so that he can achieve his 'dream'. Informing Top that he cannot be a hero under the circumstances he is trying to set up, Barry vibrates inside Top's body and destroys his suit from the inside, subsequently leaving him for the Renegades to take back to their future.

In other media

Television
 The Top makes a cameo appearance in the Justice League Unlimited episode "Flash and Substance". This version is a member of Gorilla Grodd's Secret Society. 
 The Top makes minor non-speaking appearances in Batman: The Brave and the Bold.
 A female version of the Top named Rosalind "Rosa" Dillon appears in The Flash, portrayed by Ashley Rickards. Introduced in the third season episode "The New Rogues", this version is in a romantic relationship with Sam Scudder, whom she aids in multiple heists until they were both betrayed by their then other partner Leonard Snart three years prior. Shortly after, Scudder and Dillon were exposed to dark matter released by S.T.A.R. Labs' particle accelerator, with the resulting shockwave trapping Scudder inside a mirror and turning Dillon into a metahuman with the ability to induce vertigo via eye contact. After Scudder breaks out in the present, he breaks her out of Iron Heights Penitentiary and they start a crime spree together, only to be stopped by the Flash and Jesse Quick. In a possible future depicted in the episode "The Once and Future Flash", Dillon and Scudder took over Central City by combining their powers. After the Flash travels to this future and is defeated by the pair, the speedster receives help from his future self and Cisco Ramon, who defeat the criminals and see them arrested. As of the seventh season premiere "All's Well That Ends Wells", Dillon and Scudder joined Black Hole until Eva McCulloch kills him and sways the former to her side. However, Dillon is captured by the CCPD and Cecile Horton uses her empathetic powers to overwhelm Dillon with guilt, making her reveal McCulloch's plans in retaliation for Scudder's death.

Film
The Top appears in Justice League: The Flashpoint Paradox, voiced by Dee Bradley Baker. This version is a member of the Rogues.

Video games
The Top appears in DC Universe Online, voiced by Robert S. Fisher.

External links
 Alan Kistler's Profile On: THE FLASH - A detailed analysis of the history of the Flash by comic book historian Alan Kistler. Covers information all the way from Jay Garrick to Barry Allen to today, as well as discussions on the various villains and Rogues who fought the Flash. Various art scans.

References

Comics characters introduced in 1961
DC Comics metahumans
DC Comics supervillains
DC Comics characters who can move at superhuman speeds
DC Comics telekinetics 
DC Comics telepaths
Characters created by Carmine Infantino
Characters created by John Broome
Fictional African-American people
Fictional aviators
DC Comics characters who have mental powers
Flash (comics) characters